Jamie Gorenberg is an American television producer and writer. Her most prominent work is on ABC's dramedy, Desperate Housewives. She began working on the series as a producer and screenwriter in 2007 during the series' fourth season. She also worked as a writer on Dharma & Greg and Kristin, and a producer and writer on Related and Hart of Dixie. She is married and became an advocate for lung cancer awareness following her mother's diagnosis in 2007.

References

External links
 

American soap opera writers
American television producers
Living people
Soap opera producers
American women television writers
Place of birth missing (living people)
Year of birth missing (living people)
Women soap opera writers
American women television producers
21st-century American women